Roger Zanetti (16 July 1930 – 13 January 2014) was a Swiss field hockey player. He competed at the 1952 Summer Olympics and the 1960 Summer Olympics.

References

External links
 

1930 births
2014 deaths
Swiss male field hockey players
Olympic field hockey players of Switzerland
Field hockey players at the 1952 Summer Olympics
Field hockey players at the 1960 Summer Olympics
People from Yverdon-les-Bains
Sportspeople from the canton of Vaud